On 24 January 2022, at least eight people were killed in a crowd crush at the south entrance of Olembe Stadium in Yaoundé, Cameroon. The incident occurred as fans were attempting to enter the arena to watch a football match between Cameroon and the Comoros at the 2021 Africa Cup of Nations.

Details 
Before the fourth match in the knockout stage between hosts Cameroon and the Comoros, which kicked off at 20:00 on 24 January 2022 at the Olembe Stadium, a crush developed at the south entrance to the stadium. Security officers directed fans towards a locked entrance gate. When the gate was opened, a surge of people came through and trampled each other, killing eight. 38 others were injured, with seven in critical condition.

Aftermath 
Following the event, the quarter-final match scheduled to take place at Olembe Stadium the following week was relocated to Ahmadou Ahidjo Stadium.

See also 
 Yaoundé nightclub fire, which happened the previous day

References

2022 in Cameroon
2022 disasters in Cameroon
Stadium disaster
2021 Africa Cup of Nations
Human stampedes in 2022
January 2022 events in Africa
Crowd collapses and crushes
Stadium
Man-made disasters in Cameroon
Human stampedes in Africa
Stadium disasters
Stadium disaster